

Short range UAV demonstrator Nasnas
The TAT Nasnas is an unmanned aerial vehicle (UAV). Tunisia was the first Arab country to develop this industry in 1997. In 2003, it was joined by the United Arab Emirates. The UAVs are constructed and designed in Tunisia. They are produced by the Tunisia Aero Technologies  company (TAT). The flight of the first Tunisian drone, "TAT Aoussou", took place in October 1997. It served primarily as an aerial target for anti-aircraft units. It was designed and built in eight months. The first flight of the prototype "TAT Nasnas" (or "anasnas") took place in August 1998. It was designed and built in six months.

Data from Jane's:

Dimensions

Length 2.80m
Height 1.20m
Wingspan 3.80m, hollow wing type ton hoste extra fuel bladder tanks
Diameter: rectangular fuselage pod
Twin boom configuration.
Weight dry: 43 kg
Maximum takeoff weight 120 kg
Power Plant: Twin opposed cylinders engine, 22 hp to 38 hp.
Launch conventional wheeled or catapult
Recovery conventional wheeled or parachute
Payload: day & night electro optic stabilized payload. Other scientific payloads upon client requirement.
Use: TADA, Surveillance, Intelligence, pipeline surveillance, meteo, remote sensing for mapping.

Performance

Speed 70kt
Autonomy > 11hr
Ceiling 5.000m
Mission Radius: 200 km LOS.

Datalinks

Datalink: LOS datalink 
Guidance:telemetry command via autopilot and GPS (production version)
System: Not Available
Fuel: Not Available

Payloads

FLIR or TV camera. Scientific instrumentation
25 kg *.

TAT Jebelassa 650
The Jebelassa 650 (means in Arabic: Mountain Watch) has evolved subsequently to give birth to a new version of the Smaller Nasnas which is "stronger and more polished".

wingspan: 6m50
area of 3.80 m2 wing
length 3m80
height 1.30m
weight, 158 kg dry, maximum takeoff weight 270 kg
payload of 55 30 kg
cruising speed 170 km / h, Loiter Speed: 120 km/h
altitude of 5,200 m.
24h autonomy flight
 engine: 38 hp diesel/jet A1/injection modified engine.*Mission Radius: 200 km. Can be extended to 800 km when using Radio Relays.

The first flight of the prototype Jebelassa took place in 2004. It has a larger radius of action
the UAV can carry more payloads and missions.

Fixed Wing HALE UAV: Buraq

Specifications
Data from

 Very long endurance surveillance (up to 60 hours) with capability to carry heavy loads.
 Missions: Meteorology, Mapping, Reconnaissance.
Military/Civil Heavy Loads:
Complex sensors (e.g. RAPTOR pod);
Weapons: anti-tank, anti-ship, anti-bunker missiles, etc.
Possibility to deploy military/emergency supplies in hostile territory or in case of natural disasters.
Possibility to deploy anti-mine  devices.
Possibility to carry large meteorogical-sensors.
Possibility to deploy fire/pollution retardants in case of disasters.
Possibility to deploy life-boats in case of maritime disasters.

Rotary Wing UAV: Jinn (Project) 
Tunisia Aero Technologies Industries is looking for investors to develop the TATI Jinn

References

Unmanned aerial vehicles of Tunisia